Walter Gotthard Werner (11 April 1883 – 8 January 1956) was a German actor. He appeared in more than seventy films from 1921 to 1956.

Selected filmography

References

External links 

1883 births
1956 deaths
German male film actors
German male silent film actors
20th-century German male actors
People from Görlitz